Thyrosticta angustipennis is a moth in the subfamily Arctiinae. It was described by Ferdinand Le Cerf in 1921. It is found on Madagascar.

References

Moths described in 1924
Arctiinae